Padworth Common is a hamlet and common in the English county of Berkshire, within the civil parish of Padworth. It is bounded by Burghfield to the east and Aldermaston to the west. To the north is Padworth and to the south is Mortimer West End.

Geography
On the southern edge of Padworth Common is the 28-hectare Padworth Common Local Nature Reserve.

References

Hamlets in Berkshire
West Berkshire District